Margaret Heather Laird,  ( Polmear; 29 January 1933 – 11 May 2014) was a British teacher and senior laywoman in the Church of England. From 1989 to 1999, she served as the Third Church Estates Commissioner, having been appointed by the Archbishop of Canterbury; the Church Commissioners is a body which administers the property assets of the Church of England and the Third Church Estates Commissioner attends the Church's General Synod.

Early life and education
Margaret Heather Polmear was born on 29 January 1933 in Truro, Cornwall, England. As a child, her father attended the  Anglo-Catholic Church of St Paul, Truro and her mother attended the local Methodist chapel. Having attended both church and chapel, she was confirmed in the Church of England. She was educated at Truro High School, an all-girls private school in Truro, where she became head girl. She then studied medieval history at Westfield College, London, then an all-girls college of the University of London, and graduated with a Bachelor of Arts (BA) degree in 1954. She then undertook further studies at King's College London, completing a postgraduate certificate in religious knowledge in 1955.

Career

Teaching
Laird's first career was in teaching. She was divinity mistress at the Grey Coat Hospital, an all-girls state school in London, from 1955 to 1959. She then taught at Newquay Grammar School, a co-education state grammar school in Newquay (1959 to 1960), and at St Albans High School, an all-girls private school in St Albans (1960 to 1962). Having married in 1961, she took a break from teaching to "concentrated on motherhood". She returned to her career, and her final teaching position was as head of religious studies at Dame Alice Harpur School, an all-girls independent school in Bedford, between 1969 and 1989.

Church service
In 1980, Laird was elected to the General Synod of the Church of England as a representative from the Diocese of St Albans. She continued to sit as a lay member from that diocese until she became an ex-officio member as a church commissioner from 1990. In September 1988, she was selected by Robert Runcie, the then Archbishop of the Church of England, to be the next Third Church Estates Commissioner. The Church Commissioners is a body which administers the property assets of the Church of England, and the Third Commissioner is chosen by the Archbishop of Canterbury. She served as Third Church Estates Commissioner for a decade, between 1989 and 1999. As Commissioner, she was a member of the Standing Committee of the General Synod and of the Church of England's Pension Board during her time in office.

In the 1999 New Year Honours, Laird was made an Officer of the Order of the British Empire (OBE) for services as a Church Commissioner.

Active in traditionalist Anglo-Catholic circles, she was a vocal opposer of the ordination of women. From 1993, she was the first female governor of Pusey House, Oxford; she was its vice-president from 2014. She also served as vice-president of the Society for the Maintenance of the Faith from 1994 until her death, and was a trustee of the Oxford Movement Anniversary Appeal Trust between 1996 and 2010. Through her husband, she also had links with Forward in Faith.

Personal life
While studying at King's College, London, she met her future husband, John Laird. He was ordained as an Anglican priest in 1959, and they married in 1961. After parish ministry, her husband became chaplain and then principal of Bishops' College, Cheshunt, an Anglican theological college. After the closure of Bishops' College, he became a vicar and then one of the only domestic chaplains to a private family, as chaplain to the Marquess of Salisbury. Together, they had two sons: Stephen is an Anglican priest and chaplain, while Andrew is a classical scholar.

Laird's beliefs fell within the Prayer Book Catholic tradition of the Church of England.

Laird died on 11 May 2014, aged 81.

References

 

 
 
 

1933 births
2014 deaths
British schoolteachers
Church Estates Commissioners
Members of the General Synod of the Church of England
People from Truro
People educated at Truro High School
Alumni of Westfield College
Alumni of King's College London
British Anglo-Catholics
Officers of the Order of the British Empire